Francisco 'Fran' Javier Amado Gutiérrez (born 1 June 1984 in Algeciras, Bay of Gibraltar, Andalusia) is a Spanish footballer who plays as a striker.

External links

1984 births
Living people
Spanish footballers
Footballers from Algeciras
Association football forwards
Segunda División players
Segunda División B players
Tercera División players
Algeciras CF footballers
Benidorm CF footballers
AD Ceuta footballers
Albacete Balompié players
Pontevedra CF footballers
Polideportivo Ejido footballers
Orihuela CF players
AD Ceuta FC players